The Wing's Neck Light is a historic lighthouse in the Pocasset village of Bourne, Massachusetts.  It is located on Wing's Neck Road at the end of Wing's Neck, a peninsula between Pocasset Harbor and the Hog Island Channel, which provides access to the Cape Cod Canal.  The first lighthouse was built in the site in 1849; it was a stone keeper's house with a wood-frame tower above, and was destroyed by fire in 1878.

The present lighthouse and keeper's house were built in 1889; it is the only extant wood-frame light and keeper's house connected by a covered way from that period.

The lighthouse was listed on the National Register of Historic Places in 1987.

See also
 National Register of Historic Places listings in Barnstable County, Massachusetts

References

External links
 
 Wing’s Neck Light at the National Park Service

Lighthouses completed in 1889
Lighthouses on the National Register of Historic Places in Massachusetts
Lighthouses in Barnstable County, Massachusetts
Bourne, Massachusetts
National Register of Historic Places in Barnstable County, Massachusetts
Pocasset, Massachusetts